Raymond Burton is a former professional rugby league footballer who played in the 1950s. He played at club level for Castleford (Heritage № 387).

References

External links
Search for "Burton" at rugbyleagueproject.org
Raymond Burton Memory Box Search at archive.castigersheritage.com
Ray Burton Memory Box Search at archive.castigersheritage.com

Living people
Castleford Tigers players
English rugby league players
Place of birth missing (living people)
Year of birth missing (living people)